Flashy Bull (foaled March 13, 2003) by Jerry and Liz Squyres at Crowning Point Farm in Paris, Kentucky is an American thoroughbred racehorse.  He was sired by the 1994 U.S. Horse of the Year Holy Bull out of the mare, Iridescence.

He was a contender for the Triple Crown in 2006.

As of July, 2007, he had started 19 times, winning 5, placing in 5, and showing in three and had lifetime earnings of $844,313.

In August, 2007, he was retired to stud due to a cracked sesamoid bone in his left ankle, believed to have happened in the Whitney Handicap at Saratoga Race Course on July 28 where he was unplaced.

Connections

Flashy Bull was owned by West Point Thoroughbreds and was trained by Kiaran McLaughlin.  His rider in the Kentucky Derby was Mike E. Smith.  He was ridden to a third-place finish in the Ohio Derby by Luis Antonio Gonzalez.

Races

References
 Flashy Bull's pedigree
 2006 Derby Contenders Flashy Bull
 NTRA Flashy Bull Retired

Racehorses bred in Kentucky
2003 racehorse births
Racehorses trained in the United States
Thoroughbred family 9-f